Stamford and Spalding was a county constituency in Lincolnshire, which returned one Member of Parliament (MP) to the House of Commons of the Parliament of the United Kingdom.

The constituency was created for the 1983 general election, and abolished for the 1997 general election.

Boundaries
The District of South Kesteven wards of All Saints, Aveland, Bourne East, Bourne West, Casewick, Deeping St James, Devon, Forest, Glen Eden, Hillsides, Isaac Newton, Lincrest, Market and West Deeping, Morkery, Ringstone, St George's, St Mary's, Stamford St John's, Toller, and Truesdale, and the District of South Holland wards of Crowland, Deeping St Nicholas, Gosberton Village, Pinchbeck East, Pinchbeck West, Spalding Central, Spalding East, Spalding North, Spalding South, Spalding West, Surlfeet, and Weston.

Members of Parliament

Elections

Elections in the 1980s

Elections in the 1990s

See also
 Stamford (UK Parliament list of constituencies)
List of parliamentary constituencies in Lincolnshire

Notes and references 

Parliamentary constituencies in Lincolnshire (historic)
Constituencies of the Parliament of the United Kingdom established in 1983
Constituencies of the Parliament of the United Kingdom disestablished in 1997